Jonathan Sonne is an American Magic: The Gathering player. He has reached the top eight of a Pro Tour once, and has won two Grand Prix. He was also part of the US national team that placed second at the World Championship in 2005.

Achievements

References

American Magic: The Gathering players
Living people
Year of birth missing (living people)
People from Knowlton Township, New Jersey